Paolo Pestrin (July 9, 1936 in San Giorgio di Nogaro – July 2009) was an Italian professional football player.

He played for 12 seasons (268 games, 24 goals) in the Serie A for Genoa C.F.C., A.S. Roma and A.C. Torino.

His younger brother Settimo Pestrin also played football professionally. To distinguish them, Paolo was referred to as Pestrin I and Settimo as Pestrin II.

Honours
 1960–61 Inter-Cities Fairs Cup winner (scored a goal in the final).

References

1936 births
2009 deaths
Italian footballers
Serie A players
Genoa C.F.C. players
A.S. Roma players
Calcio Padova players
Torino F.C. players
Piacenza Calcio 1919 players
F.S. Sestrese Calcio 1919 players
Association football midfielders